Ramón Encinas (19 May 1893 in Pontevedra – 21 March 1967 in Madrid) was a Spanish football player and manager. As manager, he coached Celta Vigo, Alavés, Sevilla, Valencia and Real Madrid. He led Valencia and Sevilla to their first league titles.

References

External links
 Ramón Encinas on Real Madrid Official site.

1893 births
1967 deaths
Spanish footballers
Footballers from Pontevedra
Spanish football managers
RC Celta de Vigo managers
Deportivo Alavés managers
Sevilla FC managers
Valencia CF managers
Real Madrid CF managers
Association footballers not categorized by position